is a Japanese actress from Kanagawa Prefecture, Japan. She is represented by the agency Sweet Power.

Biography 
Takatsuki made her acting debut in the television drama "TSC Tokyo Girl" in September 2008. She was a member of the idol group, bump.y from 2009 to 2014.

Filmography

Film

Television

Theatre

Bibliography

Photobooks
 16 (Wani Books, 10 August 2013)

See also
Maki Horikita (same agency)
Meisa Kuroki (same agency)

References

External links
  
 Official Blog - Ameba Blog 
  
 

1997 births
Living people
21st-century Japanese actresses
Japanese child actresses
Japanese female models
Japanese film actresses
Japanese women pop singers
Japanese television actresses
Japanese voice actresses
People from Kanagawa Prefecture
Musicians from Kanagawa Prefecture
21st-century Japanese singers
21st-century Japanese women singers